Magik Five: Heaven Beyond is the fifth album in the Magik series by well-known trance DJ and producer Tiësto. As with the rest of the Magik series, the album is a live turntable mix.

Track listing
 Armin van Buuren and DJ Tiësto present Alibi – "Eternity" (Innercity Mix) – 5:08
 Allure – "No More Tears" – 4:54
 Kamaya Painters – "Cryptomnesia" – 4:39
 Atlantis – "Fiji" – 5:51
 Twilight – "Platina" (Maurits Paardekooper Remix) – 2:33
 Eve – "Riser" – 3:43
 Fire & Ice – "Neverending Melody" – 5:29
 Yahel – "Open Your Mind" (Magikal Remake) – 5:46
 Airwave – "Alone In The Dark" – 5:46
 Chant – "Sweet Images" (DJ Sakin and Friends remix) – 4:30
 Deniro – "State Of Mind" – 5:16
 DJ Merlyn – "Krass" – 4:59 (Mislabeled, Original name is DJ Merlyn – "Stupid")
 DJ Arabesque – "Serendipity" (Mas Mix) – 3:41
 Oliver Lieb – "Subraumstimulation" (Main Mix) – 3:27
 Transa – "Supernova" – 4:37
 Rank 1 – "Airwave" – 3:31

Tiësto compilation albums
2001 compilation albums
Black Hole Recordings albums